Twin Pine casino is an Indian casino located in Middletown, California. It opened in November 1994 and is owned by the Middletown Rancheria of Pomo Indians.

The  casino has over 500 gaming machines, and 12 gaming tables.

The hotel, first planned in 2007, and opened in 2009, has 60 rooms.

References

External links
Official Website
Online Slot Games
Fast Payout Casinos

Casinos completed in 1994
Casinos in California
Pomo tribe
Buildings and structures in Lake County, California
Tourist attractions in Lake County, California
1994 establishments in California
Casino hotels